Holbrook is a village situated close to the northern shore of the estuary of the River Stour, in Suffolk, England.

To the south of the village is the Royal Hospital School, which moved to this site in 1933 after having been housed at Greenwich Hospital since 1693.

Lower Holbrook is a hamlet between the villages of Holbrook and Harkstead.

Governance
An electoral ward of the same name exists. The population of this ward at the 2011 census was 2,467.

Facilities 
The village has two pubs, The Compasses and The Swan, a Co-op store, a butcher, an art gallery, and a village hall. The area is served by a primary school and Holbrook Academy, which shares a site with the Peninsula Dr Letman Centre. The parish church, dedicated to All Saints, is a Grade II* listed building. The village also has Methodist church.

History
During the Battle of Britain, a German military aircraft crashed into a field on the outskirts of the village. Contemporary newspaper accounts identified the aircraft as a Messerschmitt.

Notable people
Frederick Fryer (1849-1917), first-class cricketer, was born in the village

References

External links

Village website
All Saints' Church Suffolk Churches

Holbrook at genuki

 
Villages in Suffolk
Civil parishes in Suffolk
Babergh District